The Arctic ice pack is the sea ice cover of the Arctic Ocean and its vicinity. The Arctic ice pack undergoes a regular seasonal cycle in which ice melts in spring and summer, reaches a minimum around mid-September, then increases during fall and winter. Summer ice cover in the Arctic is about 50% of winter cover. Some of the ice survives from one year to the next. The regular seasonal cycle there has been an underlying trend of declining sea ice in the Arctic in recent decades as well.

Climatic importance

Energy balance effects

Sea ice has an important effect on the heat balance of the polar oceans, since it insulates the (relatively) warm ocean from the much colder air above, thus reducing heat loss from the oceans. Sea ice is highly reflective of solar radiation, reflecting about 60% of incoming solar radiation when bare and about 80% when covered with snow. This is due to a feedback known as the albedo effect. This is much greater than the reflectivity of the sea (about 10%) and thus the ice also affects the absorption of sunlight at the surface.

Hydrological effects
The sea ice cycle is also an important source of dense (saline) "bottom water." When sea water freezes it leaves most of its salt content behind. The remaining surface water, made dense by the extra salinity, sinks and produces dense water masses such as North Atlantic Deep Water. This production of dense water is essential in maintaining the thermohaline circulation, and the accurate representation of these processes is important in climate modelling.

Odden 
In the Arctic, a key area where pancake ice forms the dominant ice type over an entire region is the so-called Odden ice tongue in the Greenland Sea. The Odden (the word is Norwegian for the headland) grows eastward from the main East Greenland ice edge in the vicinity of 72–74°N during the winter because of the presence of very cold polar surface water in the Jan Mayen Current, which diverts some water eastward from the East Greenland Current at that latitude. Most of the old ice continues south, driven by the wind, so a cold open water surface is exposed on which new ice forms as frazil and pancake in the rough seas.

Extent and volume of sea ice and their trends

Records of Arctic Sea ice from the United Kingdom's Hadley Centre for Climate Prediction and Research go back to the turn of the 20th century, although the quality of the data before 1950 is debatable. Reliable measurements of sea ice edge begin within the satellite era. From the late 1970s, the Scanning Multichannel Microwave Radiometer (SMMR) on Seasat (1978) and Nimbus 7 (1978–87) satellites provided information that was independent of solar illumination or meteorological conditions. The frequency and accuracy of passive microwave measurements improved with the launch of the DMSP F8 Special Sensor Microwave/Imager (SSMI) in 1987. Both the sea ice area and extent are estimated, with the latter being larger, as it is defined as the area of ocean with at least 15% sea ice.

A modeling study of the 52-year period from 1947 to 1999 found a statistically significant trend in Arctic ice volume of −3% per decade; splitting this into wind-forced and temperature forced components shows it to be essentially all caused by the temperature forcing. A computer-based, time-resolved calculation of sea ice volume, fitted to various measurements, revealed that monitoring the ice volume is much more significant for evaluating sea ice loss than pure area considerations.

The ice extent trends from 1979 to 2002 have been a statistically significant Arctic sea ice decrease of −2.5% ± 0.9% per decade during those 23 years. Climate models simulated this trend in 2002. The September minimum ice extent trend for 1979–2011 declined by 12.0% per decade during 32 years. New research shows the Arctic Sea ice to be melting faster than predicted by any of the 18 computer models used by the Intergovernmental Panel on Climate Change in preparing its 2007 assessments.

In the overall mass balance, the volume of sea ice depends on the thickness of the ice as well as the areal extent. While the satellite era has enabled better measurement of trends in areal extent, accurate ice thickness measurements remain a challenge. "Nonetheless, the extreme loss of this summer's sea ice cover and the slow onset of freeze-up portends lower than normal ice extent throughout autumn and winter, and the ice that grows back is likely to be fairly thin". As more and more of the sea ice is thinner first-year ice the greater effect storms have on its stability with turbulence resulting from major extratropical cyclones resulting in extensive fractures of sea ice.

See also 

Arctic sea ice ecology and history
Global warming
Iceberg
Polar ice cap
Polynya
Shelf ice
Antarctic sea ice

References

External links
Global Sea Ice Extent and Concentration (NSIDC)
Sea ice extent graphs since 1979 (NSIDC)
Sea Ice Index (NSIDC)
NOAA Arctic Program
"Ice-free Arctic could be here in 23 years" (2007)

Sea ice
Glaciology
Arctic Ocean
Earth phenomena
Articles containing video clips
Climate change and the environment